Andrea S Haines is a New Zealand university tutor, film organiser and unionist. She is also a Justice of the peace

Academic career
Haines is a senior tutor at Waikato University and has published extensively on teaching academic and writing skills Her current role is Team Leader in Student Learning.

Film
A bastion of the Hamilton Film Society, Haines is a past-president of the New Zealand Federation of Film Societies.
Starting in 2008, Haines served a three-year term on the Film and Literature Board of Review under the Films, Videos and Publications Classification Act 1993. Haines has also served as judge in a number of film awards.

Union activities
Active in the Tertiary Education Union, it awarded Haines a Meritorious Service Award in 2013 Haines was the TEU representative on the Teaching Matters Forum, a government-appointed group to set up a National Centre for Tertiary Teaching Excellence.

References

External links
 institutional homepage

Living people
Academic staff of the University of Waikato
Year of birth missing (living people)
Place of birth missing (living people)